Petr Havelka (born March 3, 1979) is a Czech former professional ice hockey left winger.  He played in the Czech Extraliga for HC Sparta Prague, HC Kladno and HC Plzeň. He was drafted 152nd overall by the Pittsburgh Penguins in the 1997 NHL Entry Draft.

References

External links

1979 births
Living people
Czech ice hockey left wingers
Motor České Budějovice players
Rytíři Kladno players
HC Plzeň players
HC Slovan Ústečtí Lvi players
HC Sparta Praha players
Pittsburgh Penguins draft picks